Simone Bolelli and Fabio Fognini defeated Lloyd Glasspool and Harri Heliövaara in the final, 5–7, 7–6(8–6), [10–7] to win the doubles tennis title at the 2022 Croatia Open Umag. The Italians saved six match points in the second-set tie-break from 0–6 down.

Fernando Romboli and David Vega Hernández were the defending champions, but did not compete together. Romboli partnered Albano Olivetti, but lost in the first round to Rafael Matos and Vega Hernández. Matos and Vega Hernández lost in the semifinals to Glasspool and Heliövaara.

Seeds

Draw

Draw

References

External links
 Main draw

Croatia Open Umag - Doubles